In June 2017, England played a two-test series against  as part of the 2017 mid-year rugby union tests. The series was part of the fifth year of the global rugby calendar established by the International Rugby Board, which runs through to 2019.

Fixtures

Squads
Note: Ages, caps and clubs are as per 10 June, the first test match of the tour.

England
On 20 April, head coach Eddie Jones named a 30-man squad for England's two-test series against Argentina. Piers Francis and Sam Underhill, although playing outside England, were listed as both players are signed with an English club for the 2017/18 season.

On 21 May, James Haskell withdrew from the squad after being called up to the British and Irish Lions as an injury replacement.

On 29 May, Jones finalized England's touring squad for the series against Argentina. Nick Schonert, Mark Wilson and Marland Yarde were promoted from the additional players added to the squad for the XV side to play the Barbarians, while Don Armand and Ollie Devoto joined following the Aviva premiership final. Luke Cowan-Dickie, Paul Hill, Tom Wood and Joe Marchant withdrew from the squad.

Coaching team:
 Head coach:  Eddie Jones
 Defence coach:  Paul Gustard
 Attack/Skills coach:  Glen Ella

On 21 May, several players were subsequently called up by Jones for the Barbarians game due to the Aviva Premiership final between Wasps and Exeter Chiefs.

Note: Ages, caps and clubs are as per 28 May, the day England played the Barbarians.

Argentina
On 29 May, Argentina named a 32-man squad for their two-test series against England and the one-off test match against Georgia.

Coaching team:
 Head coach:  Daniel Hourcade
 Defence coach:  Pablo Bouza
 Backs coach:  Germán Fernández
 Forwards coach:  Emiliano Bergamaschi

Matches

Warm-up match

First test

Second test

See also
 2017 mid-year rugby union internationals
 History of rugby union matches between Argentina and England

References

2017
Argentina
2017 rugby union tours
2017 in Argentine rugby union
June 2017 sports events in South America